The Mistral is German single-place paraglider that was designed and produced by Swing Flugsportgeräte of Landsberied. It is now out of production.

Design and development
The Mistral was designed as an intermediate glider. A two-seat tandem version was also developed for flight training, the Mistral Twin 1 and Twin 2.

The design progressed through seven generations of models, each improving on the last. The earlier models are each named for their approximate projected wing area in square metres and the Mistral 7 for its relative size.

Variants

Mistral 2
Mistral 2 22
Small-sized model for lighter pilots. The glider model is Deutscher Hängegleiterverband e.V. (DHV) 1-2 certified.
Mistral 2 24
Mid-sized model for medium-weight pilots. The glider model is DHV 1-2 certified.
Mistral 2 26
Large-sized model for heavier pilots. The glider model is DHV 1-2 certified.
Mistral 2 28
Extra large-sized model for heavier pilots. The glider model is DHV 1-2 certified.

Mistral 3
Mistral 3 22
Extra small-sized model for lighter pilots. The glider model is DHV LTF 1-2 certified.
Mistral 3 24
Small-sized model for lightweight pilots. The glider model is DHV LTF 1-2 certified.
Mistral 3 26
Medium-sized model for mid-weight pilots. The glider model is DHV LTF 1-2 certified.
Mistral 3 28
Large-sized model for heavier pilots. The glider model is DHV LTF 1-2 certified.
Mistral 3 30
Extra large-sized model for much heavier pilots. The glider model is DHV LTF 1-2 certified.

Mistral 4
Mistral 4 22
Extra small-sized model for lighter pilots. The glider model is DHV LTF 1-2 certified.
Mistral 4 24
Small-sized model for lightweight pilots. The glider model is DHV LTF 1-2 certified.
Mistral 4 26
Medium-sized model for mid-weight pilots. The glider model is DHV LTF 1-2 certified.
Mistral 4 28
Large-sized model for heavier pilots. The glider model is DHV LTF 1-2 certified.
Mistral 4 30
Extra large-sized model for much heavier pilots. The glider model is DHV LTF 1-2 certified.

Mistral 5
Mistral 5 22
Extra small-sized model for lighter pilots. The glider model is DHV LTF 1-2 and CEN  B certified.
Mistral 5 24
Small-sized model for lightweight pilots. The glider model is DHV LTF 1-2 and CEN  B certified.
Mistral 5 26
Medium-sized model for mid-weight pilots. The glider model is DHV LTF 1-2 and CEN  B certified.
Mistral 5 28
Large-sized model for heavier pilots. The glider model is DHV LTF 1-2 and CEN  B certified.
Mistral 5 30
Extra large-sized model for much heavier pilots. The glider model is DHV LTF 1-2 and CEN  B certified.

Mistral 6
Mistral 6 22
Extra small-sized model for lighter pilots. The glider model is DHV LTF B and CEN  B certified.
Mistral 6 24
Small-sized model for lightweight pilots. The glider model is DHV LTF B and CEN  B certified.
Mistral 6 26
Medium-sized model for mid-weight pilots. The glider model is DHV LTF B and CEN  B certified.
Mistral 6 28
Large-sized model for heavier pilots. The glider model is DHV LTF B and CEN  B certified.
Mistral 6 30
Extra large-sized model for much heavier pilots. The glider model is DHV LTF B and CEN  B certified.

Mistral 7
Mistral 7 XS
Extra small-sized model for lighter pilots. The glider model is DHV LTF B and CEN  B certified.
Mistral 7 S
Small-sized model for lightweight pilots. The glider model is DHV LTF B and CEN  B certified.
Mistral 7 M
Medium-sized model for mid-weight pilots. The glider model is DHV LTF B and CEN  B certified.
Mistral 7 L
Large-sized model for heavier pilots. The glider model is DHV LTF B and CEN  B certified.
Mistral 7 XL
Extra large-sized model for much heavier pilots. The glider model is DHV LTF B and CEN  B certified.

Mistral Twin 2
Mistral Twin 2 35
Small-sized model for lighter crew. The glider model is DHV LTF 1-2 certified.
Mistral Twin 2 38
Large-sized model for heavier crew. The glider model is DHV LTF 1-2 certified.

Specifications (Mistral 2 24)

References

External links

Mistral
Paragliders